The Sweden Davis Cup team represents Sweden in Davis Cup tennis competition and is governed by the Swedish Tennis Association.

As of 2019, Sweden is the 5th most successful nation in Davis Cup history, having won the title 7 times, 6 of which have been recorded since 1981 when the tiered system and the World Group were created, which makes the Swedish team the most successful one in this modern period.

In September 2012, Sweden was relegated from the World Group after being defeated, 0–5, against Belgium, and played in the Europe/Africa Zone Group I in seasons 2013, 2014, and 2015. In 2016, Sweden was relegated to the Europe/Africa Zone Group II, but after a successful 2017 campaign, managed to return to the Europe/Africa Zone Group I, for 2018. In September 2018, Sweden defeated Switzerland in their World Group play-off tie and, as a result, guaranteed themselves a seeding for the February 2019, Qualifying Round for the new-look Davis Cup Finals in 2019.

Sweden failed to advanced to the Davis Cup Finals as it lost its World Group play-off, against Colombia, during February 2019. After beating Israel in September 2019, Sweden once again won a place in the 2020 Qualifiers.

Current team (2022) 

 Mikael Ymer
 Elias Ymer
 Dragoș Nicolae Mădăraș
 Jonathan Mridha
 André Göransson (Doubles player)

History

As the 26th nation Sweden entered their first competition in 1925. Led by the captain Fredrik Bohnstedt the Swedes defeated the Swiss at LTC Bern. The first nominated team included Sune Malmström, Marcus Wallenberg and Carl-Erik von Braun.

All players

References

External links

Davis Cup teams
Davis Cup
Davis Cup
1925 establishments in Sweden